Michael Snyder may refer to:

 Michael Snyder (accountant) (born 1950), British businessman and politician
 Michael James Snyder (1950–2018), American business executive
 Michael P. Snyder (born 1955), American genomicist, systems biologist, and entrepreneur